Chak No 111/1.L Punjab, Pakistan is a village located about 18 kilometres towards south of Rahim Yar Khan. This village is situated in Union Council 45, Khanpur, Rahim Yar Khan District.

About 
Mostly there are Mangrio Family and also some other castes live here like Chania Mahar, Kamboh Punjabi and Meer. Some non-Muslim Thori also exist here.  Numberdar of this village belong to Mangrio family. The previous Number Dar of this chak was Hazor Buksh and now his son Mehr Dein . Haji Shah Muhammad, LaL Bukhsh, Peer Buksh, Khair Dein, Allah Buksh,Imam Dein, Allah Dein,Muhammad Murad, Ruken Dein, Faqeer Buksh, Ghulam Sarwar and Ghulam Nabi, Gull Hassan and Most senior persons of this village Muhammad Imran Mangrio. They are totly landlord and businessman.

Culture 

The village culture is Sindhi and Punjabi. As people are Muslim by birth and faith.

Education 

The village has one government and two private schools. There is also a religious institute and a mosque in this village.

Crops and irrigation 
The main crops of the village are Sugar cane, Cotton, Oil Seeds and Pulses while wheat being the major food crop. There are also Malta (orange) and Mango farms in the village.

Manpower 
About 90 percent of the village's population from whom agriculture is the main occupation to earn their living. The remainder one percent are serving in Government institutions, forces, technical and Business sector.

References 

Villages in Rahim Yar Khan District